{
  "type": "FeatureCollection",
  "features": [
    {
      "type": "Feature",
      "geometry": { "type": "Point", "coordinates": [113.2973, 22.47] },
      "properties": { "title": "Longdu", "marker-symbol": "1", "marker-size": "small", "marker-color": "00f" }
    },
    {
      "type": "Feature",
      "geometry": { "type": "Point", "coordinates": [113.5253, 22.5] },
      "properties": { "title": "Nanlang", "marker-symbol": "2", "marker-size": "small", "marker-color": "070" }
    },
    {
      "type": "Feature",
      "geometry": { "type": "Point", "coordinates": [113.4276, 22.35635] },
      "properties": { "title": "Sanxiang", "marker-symbol": "3", "marker-size": "small", "marker-color": "c00" }
    }
  ]
}
Zhongshan Min, known as Cunhua by its speakers, are three Min Chinese dialect islands in the Zhongshan region of the southern Chinese province of Guangdong. The Zhongshan Min people settled in the region from Fujian Province as early as the Northern Song dynasty period (1023–1031).
The three dialects are:
 Longdu dialect, spoken mainly in Shaxi and Dachong in the west of the prefecture,
 Nanlang dialect or Dongxiang dialect, spoken mainly in Nanlang and Zhangjiabian in the east, and
 Sanxiang dialect, spoken in Sanxiang in the south.
According to Nicholas Bodman, the Longdu and Nanlang dialects belong to the Eastern Min group, while the Sanxiang dialect belongs to Southern Min.  All three have been heavily influenced by the Shiqi dialect, the local variety of Yue Chinese.

As the dialect with the most speakers, the Longdu dialect may be taken as the representative dialect of Zhongshan Min.

Notes

References

See also
 

Zhongshan
Southern Min